David Boushy (born January 25, 1932) is a politician in Ontario, Canada. He served as a Progressive Conservative member of the Legislative Assembly of Ontario from 1995 to 1999.

Background
He was educated at Narj' Oyoun National College in Lebanon. He worked for Esso Chemicals after moving to Canada, and was the founder and editor of the Sarnia Visitor's Guide. Boushy served for over 30 years as a city councillor for Sarnia City Council, and was the secretary of the local Progressive Conservative association.

Politics
Boushy was elected to the Ontario legislature in the 1995 provincial election, defeating Liberal Joan Link and incumbent New Democrat Bob Huget. He served as a  backbench supporter of Mike Harris's government for the next four years.

Boushy lost to Liberal Caroline Di Cocco by about 3,000 votes in the 1999 provincial election, in the redistributed riding of Sarnia—Lambton. He subsequently returned to municipal politics, and is still a member of the Sarnia municipal council as of 2017.

On November 18, 2005 a Long-standing Service Award was presented to David Boushy by the Ontario Government for his over 25 years of Municipal Service and for "showing immense leadership and commitment to his community of Sarnia Lambton".

Electoral record

References

External links
 

1932 births
Living people
Progressive Conservative Party of Ontario MPPs
Sarnia city councillors
Canadian politicians of Lebanese descent